was a village located in Uda District, Nara Prefecture, Japan.

As of 2005, the village had an estimated population of 5,939 and a density of 55.00 persons per km². The total area was 107.99 km².

On January 1, 2006, Murō, along with the towns of Haibara, Ōuda and Utano (all from Uda District), was merged to create the city of Uda.

Dissolved municipalities of Nara Prefecture

Populated places disestablished in 2006
2006 disestablishments in Japan
Uda, Nara